Ladislav Sitenský (7 August 1919 – 14 November 2009) was a Czech landscape photographer, a contributor to the illustrated weekly Pestrý týden, and well-known also for his photography from World War II, when he was a technician for the Czech wing of the Royal Air Force.

External links
Radio Prague - extensive biography

Official website 
 http://www.sitensky.eu

Czech photographers
1919 births
2009 deaths
Recipients of Medal of Merit (Czech Republic)
Photographers from Prague
Czechoslovak artists